Dennis Broad (born 19 October 1956) is a South African cricketer. He played in three first-class matches for Eastern Province in 1981/82.

See also
 List of Eastern Province representative cricketers

References

External links
 

1956 births
Living people
South African cricketers
Eastern Province cricketers
Cricketers from Johannesburg